Wangjing railway station is a railway station in Chaoyang District, Beijing.

Stations on the Beijing–Baotou Railway
Railway stations in Beijing